Rothrock is a surname. Notable people with the surname include:

Arthur Rothrock, American sport shooter 
Cynthia Rothrock, American actress and martial artist
George A. Rothrock, American university professor
Jack Rothrock, American baseball player
James H. Rothrock, American judge
Joseph Rothrock, American environmentalist
Joseph J. Rothrock, American college sports coach
Mary U. Rothrock, American librarian and historian
Tom Rothrock, American record producer, composer and musician

See also
Rothrock Field Airport, private airport in Oregon
Rothrock Stadium in Jackson, Tennessee
Rothrock State Forest in Pennsylvania